The 2022–23 season is the 144th season in the existence of Doncaster Rovers Football Club and the club's first season back in League Two since the 2016–17 season following their relegation from League One last season. In addition to the league, they will also compete in the 2022–23 FA Cup, the 2022–23 EFL Cup and the 2022–23 EFL Trophy.

Transfers

In

Out

Loans in

Loans out

Pre-season and friendlies
On 1 June, Doncaster Rovers appointed their pre-season schedule. Over a week later, a further friendly was confirmed against Huddersfield Town.

Competitions

Overall record

League Two

League table

Results summary

Results by round

Matches

On 23 June, the league fixtures were announced.

FA Cup

Doncaster were drawn at home against King's Lynn Town in the first round.

EFL Cup

Rovers were drawn at home to Lincoln City in the first round.

EFL Trophy

On 20 June, the initial Group stage draw was made, grouping Doncaster Rovers with Barnsley and Lincoln City. Three days later, Newcastle United U21s joined Northern Group E.

References

Doncaster Rovers F.C. seasons
Doncaster Rovers